Bangpan Boys (Hangul: 방판소년단) or BPS for short, is a South Korean Web television program aired on SBS Plus Hanbbum TV hosted by Boom, Yoo Jae-hwan and Block B's Jaehyo. It is aired every Monday through Wednesday at 11.00am KST on V Live and Naver TV, 5.00pm KST on YouTube and GOMTV.

Synopsis 
This is a web television about the 3 hosts who tries to earn a sum of money to produce a song through selling the sponsored products door-to-door either to the public or to the different celebrities.

Changes of Hosts 
On Episode 12, it was mentioned that Sam Okyere had since left the show due to his busy schedule, with Christian Burgos taking over his position.

On Episode 40, it was mentioned that Christian Burgos had left the show due to his busy schedule in Mexico, with Block B's Jaehyo taking over the MC position permanently from Episode 43 onward after being chosen through the 'New Member Interview'.

Debut 
On October 16, 2018, the 3 hosts had officially debut with their first single under the group name called 'VISIT' through SBS MTV's The Show.

On October 21, 2018, the single is made available on all major music sites.

Hosts

Current 

 Boom (Ep 1 - 79)
  (Ep 1 - 79)
 Block B's Jaehyo (Ep 43 - 79)

Former 

 Sam Okyere (Ep 1 - Ep 11)
 Christian Burgos (Ep 12 - Ep 39)

Episodes

Guests

Advertising Companies

Discography

References

External links 

 Official VLive Channel
 Official Naver Channel

South Korean web series
2018 web series debuts
2018 web series endings